The 2013–14 Loyola Greyhounds men's basketball team represented Loyola University Maryland during the 2013–14 NCAA Division I men's basketball season. The Greyhounds, led by first year head coach G.G. Smith, played their home games at Reitz Arena and were first year members of the Patriot League. They finished the season 11–19, 6–12 in Patriot League play to finish in a three way tie for seventh place. They lost in the first round of the Patriot League tournament to Lafayette.

Roster

Schedule

|-
!colspan=9 style="background:#00563F; color:#DBD9D1;"| Exhibition

|-
!colspan=9 style="background:#00563F; color:#DBD9D1;"| Regular season

|-
!colspan=9 style="background:#00563F; color:#DBD9D1;"| 2014 Patriot League tournament

References

Loyola Greyhounds men's basketball seasons
Loyola